Rocktown, Georgia is the colloquial name for an outcropping of sandstone boulders on the Appalachian Plateau in northwest Georgia. Every boulder has its own unique features, all with great foot and hand holds and very popular with climbers. The area presents challenges for all levels of climbers. There is a one-mile hike from the trail head to get to the Rocktown area. Most of these boulders are untainted by pollution and graffiti because it is in a remote part of northwest Georgia. However, in recent years as the climbing community has become increasingly aware of the area it has become more common to see trash, human waste, damaged or abandoned climbing gear, and vandalism. Because it is located in a wildlife management area, it is possible to encounter wild animals in this area, including both venomous and non-venomous snakes, bobcats, deer, wild turkeys, black bears. When climbing and exploring the boulders, caves and grottoes, it is common to encounter wasps, yellow-jackets and spiders and even the occasional bat.
"Rock Town" refers to the large outcropping approximately one(1) mile from the trailhead. Which opens into a large gallery with 5 main pathways off. This area has hundreds of spectacular formations, the entrance to a large cave, and 2 natural springs.

The Rocktown trail and area is closed annually during scheduled deer hunts.

Location
Once a preciously guarded secret among locals and a small collection of climbing enthusiasts, Rocktown trail is located on top of Pigeon Mountain in extreme Northwest Georgia. It is part of the Crockford Pigeon Mountain Wildlife Management Area and is administered by the Department of Natural Resources, Wildlife Resources Division of the State of Georgia. It is northwest of Atlanta Georgia, and just south of Chattanooga, Tennessee. The town closest to the trail is LaFayette, Georgia.  To access Crockford Pigeon Mountain WMA, one must possess a hunting or fishing license or a Georgia Lands Pass.

Activities
Although rock climbing is the most popular activity in Rocktown, other activities include hunting, hiking, bird watching and picnicking. Camping is prohibited at Rocktown but is permitted in designated areas on certain portions of the wildlife management area.

References

External links
 Flatliners SoutheastClimbing.com coverage

Climbing areas of the United States
Geography of Walker County, Georgia
Tourist attractions in Walker County, Georgia